Tathawade is a census town in Pune district in the Indian state of Maharashtra. Tathawade is an emerging suburb of Pune. Many educational institutes like JSPM Institutes, Indira College, Balaji Institutes, Orchids International School, Blossom Public School are located here. Being at a close proximity to Hinjawadi IT Park & Expressway, the real estate has flourished here. Notable business coming up here are:
Panchshil Business Park
World Trade Center
Decathlon
Dmart near Indira College

Demographics
 India census, Tathawade had a population of 7975. Males constitute 54% of the population and females 46%. Tathavade has an average literacy rate of 54%, lower than the national average of 59.5%: male literacy is 63%, and female literacy is 44%. In Tathawade, 17% of the population is under 6 years of age.its true

References

Cities and towns in Pune district